Saint-Jean-sur-Couesnon (literally Saint-Jean on Couesnon) is a former commune in the Ille-et-Vilaine department in Brittany in northwestern France. On 1 January 2019, it was merged into the new commune Rives-du-Couesnon.

Geography

The neighboring communes are Saint-Marc-sur-Couesnon, La Chapelle-Saint-Aubert, Vendel, Saint-Georges-de-Chesné, Saint-Aubin-du-Cormier, and Mézières-sur-Couesnon.

Population

See also
Communes of the Ille-et-Vilaine department

References

External links

 Geography of Brittany
 The page of the commune on infobretagne.com
 

Former communes of Ille-et-Vilaine